Under Eighteen is a 1931 American pre-Code romantic drama film directed by Archie Mayo and starring Marian Marsh, Anita Page, Regis Toomey, and Warren William. It is based on the short story "Sky Life" by Frank Mitchell Dazey and Agnes Christine Johnston.

Premise
A wealthy Broadway producer tries to take advantage of a poor young seamstress who needs money to help her sister divorce her worthless husband.

Cast
Marian Marsh as Margie Evans
Anita Page as Sophie
Regis Toomey as Jimmie Slocum
Warren William as Raymond Harding
Norman Foster as Alf
Joyce Compton as Sybil
J. Farrell MacDonald as Pop Evans
Claire Dodd as Babsy
Paul Porcasi as François
Maude Eburne as Mrs. McCarthy
Murray Kinnell as Peterson
Dorothy Appleby as Elsie

Reception
In his New York Times review, Mordaunt Hall described the film as "earnest, rather than intelligent."

References

External links

1931 romantic drama films
American black-and-white films
American romantic drama films
Films based on short fiction
Films directed by Archie Mayo
Warner Bros. films
1931 films
1930s English-language films
1930s American films